Danieline Moore Kamya is a Liberian actress and entrepreneur. In 2007, she became the Miss Liberia USA. She is equally a spokesperson for the Africa Environment Watch.

Personal life
She has been married to Kamya, a long-time partner of hers since 2017.

Career

Beauty pageantry
Winner of Miss Liberia USA 2007

Miss Liberia Maryland 2005

She won the pageantry the following year.

Acting
Moore featured in the following movies , "Crazy in Love", which also starred Nollywood actors like Jim Iyke,  Altorro Black and Crystal Milian. The movie was premiered in Beltsville, Maryland, United States. The event was attended by many Nollywood stars including Ramsey Nouah.

“Yori yori Baby “,  which also starred Nollywood actors like Nadia Buari, Ramsey Nouah

“ Faithfullness “ , which also starred Nollywood actors like Jim Iyke.

Business
She runs chains of luxury fashion boutiques; Nalu Boutique, Nalu Couture and Glitz by Nalu, which is named after her stepdaughter. She is also the founder of D. K. M. Cosmetics and the VIXEN clothing line in Liberia.

Filmography

Yori Yori Baby 2010

Faithfulness 2011

References

External links
 Danieline Moore on Modelmayhem
 Danieline Moore on Exploretalent

Liberian actresses
Liberian businesspeople
Living people
Year of birth missing (living people)